Stanley Ransom McMillan (3 October 1904 – 3 October 1991) was a Canadian aviator.

History 
McMillan was inducted into Canada's Aviation Hall of Fame in 1974. Upon induction, the awarding committee stated that McMillan had made "outstanding contributions to Canadian aviation by the unselfish application of his exceptional skills as a pilot and navigator, despite adversity, and was instrumental in designing new operational procedures in northern Canada that have benefited this nation's growth."

In media 
McMillan worked as a special consultant for Roger Tilton's 1982 film Pilots North.

References

External links 
 Stan McMillan obituary

1904 births
1991 deaths
Canadian aviators 
Canadian Aviation Hall of Fame inductees 
Canadian World War II pilots
People from Dryden, Ontario